Vallabhnagar Legislative Assembly constituency is one of the 200 Legislative Assembly constituencies of Rajasthan state in India.

It is part of Udaipur district.

Member of the Legislative Assembly

Election results

2021 Bypoll

2018

2013

2008

2003

See also
 List of constituencies of the Rajasthan Legislative Assembly
 Udaipur district

References

Udaipur district
Assembly constituencies of Rajasthan